Harold Macarius Hyland (January 2, 1889 – August 8, 1969) was a Canadian professional ice hockey forward who played for the Montreal Wanderers, New Westminster Royals, and Ottawa Senators. He was a star in the early years of professional hockey.

Playing career
Born in Montreal, Quebec, Hyland first played professional ice hockey for the Montreal Shamrocks in the Eastern Canada Amateur Hockey Association in 1908–09, joining the Montreal Wanderers of the National Hockey Association in 1909–10 when the club won the Stanley Cup. While with the Shamrocks he played as a center but switched to right wing with the Wanderers.

Hyland played for the Wanderers until they folded in 1918, except for one season in 1911–12 when he joined the Pacific Coast Hockey Association (PCHA) New Westminster Royals. With the Royals, he played as a rover. After the Wanderers folded, he joined the Ottawa Senators, where he was named playing coach. He retired the following year.

Hyland once scored eight goals in a game against the Quebec Bulldogs in 1912–13. He scored the first hat trick in National Hockey League history, playing in the league's very first game on December 19, 1917, in which Hyland's Wanderers defeated the Toronto Arenas 10–9, in Montreal.

Hyland also played lacrosse, and in 1911 he was a teammate of Newsy Lalonde and Mickey Ion on the Vancouver Lacrosse Club. He was also a member of the Montreal Shamrocks lacrosse team playing as a home fielder.

Hyland was inducted into the Hockey Hall of Fame in 1962.

Coaching
Concurrently with his playing career in Montreal Hyland also coached hockey at Loyola College.

Career statistics

* Stanley Cup champion

Awards and achievements
1909–10 – Stanley Cup champion
1962 – Inducted into the Hockey Hall of Fame

See also
 List of players with five or more goals in an NHL game

References

External links

 

1889 births
1969 deaths
Hockey Hall of Fame inductees
Canadian ice hockey right wingers
Ice hockey people from Montreal
Ice hockey player-coaches
Montreal Wanderers (NHA) players
Montreal Wanderers (NHL) players
New Westminster Royals players
Ottawa Senators (1917) players
Stanley Cup champions
Canadian lacrosse players
Burials at Notre Dame des Neiges Cemetery